The 1980–81 Elitserien season was the sixth season of the Elitserien, the top level of ice hockey in Sweden. 10 teams participated in the league, and Farjestads BK won the championship.

Standings

Playoffs

External links
 Swedish Hockey League official site

Swedish Hockey League seasons
1980–81 in Swedish ice hockey
Swedish